Clay Township is one of thirteen townships in Owen County, Indiana, United States. As of the 2010 census, its population was 2,600 and it contained 1,083 housing units.

History
Clay Township was named for Kentucky statesman Henry Clay.

The Ennis Archaeological Site was listed on the National Register of Historic Places in 1985.

Geography

Unincorporated towns
 Braysville at 
 Freeman at 
 Whitehall at 
(This list is based on USGS data and may include former settlements.)

Cemeteries
The township contains five cemeteries: Brown, Gross, Hopewell, Livingston and Moreland.

School districts
 Spencer-Owen Community Schools

Political districts
 State House District 46
 State Senate District 39

References
 
 United States Census Bureau 2009 TIGER/Line Shapefiles
 IndianaMap

External links
 Indiana Township Association
 United Township Association of Indiana
 City-Data.com page for Clay Township

Townships in Owen County, Indiana
Townships in Indiana